C/2017 K2 (PanSTARRS) is an Oort cloud comet with an inbound hyperbolic orbit, discovered in May 2017 at a distance beyond the orbit of Saturn when it was  from the Sun. Precovery images from 2013 were located by July. It had been in the constellation of Draco from July 2007 until August 2020.

The comet is record breaking because it was already becoming active at such a distance. Only Comet Hale–Bopp produced such a show from that distance with a similar nucleus. However, this comet will not be as visible as Hale–Bopp was in 1997 in part because it does not come nearly as close to the Sun. Astronomers had never seen an active inbound comet this far out, where sunlight is 1/225th its brightness as seen from Earth. Temperatures, correspondingly, are at -440 °F (-262 °C) in the Oort cloud. However, as it was approaching the Sun at a distance of 16 AU at discovery, a mix of ancient ices on the surface containing oxygen, nitrogen, carbon dioxide and carbon monoxide began to sublimate and shed the dust frozen into it. Outgasing of carbon monoxide was detected when the comet was 6.72 AU from the Sun.

The comet was within  of Earth by 11 January 2022. Around 6 July 2022, the comet crossed the celestial equator, and then on 14 July 2022, it passed  from Earth and shone around 9.0 magnitude making it a decent binoculars object. It reached perihelion on 19 December 2022, close to the orbit of Mars, and was not be visible to naked eye at 8.0 magnitude.

On 27 July 2021, further detailed observations of the comet were reported on The Astronomer's Telegram.
 
The heliocentric orbital eccentricity drops below 1 in December 2023. The outbound orbital period will be around  years with aphelion being around 1400 AU. There was a dispute whether that was the first time the comet entered the inner solar system, but its orbit suggests that the comet isn't dynamically new and there is a 29% chance that the comet is of interstellar origin and was captured in the solar system the last 3 million years.

Gallery

References

Notes

External links 
 C/2017 K2 (PANSTARRS) Taken by ALBERTO QUIJANO VODNIZA on August 9, 2022 @ PASTO,NARINO. COLOMBIA
 A Comet Active Beyond the Crystallization Zone
 MPEC 2017-K90 : COMET C/2017 K2 (PANSTARRS)
 NASA's Hubble Observes the Farthest Active Inbound Comet Yet Seen
 Note on the dynamical evolution of C/2017 K2 PANSTARRS (arXiv 2018)
 C/2017 K2  EarthSky July 12 2022
 C/2017 K2 (PANSTARRS) motion as seen by Catalina Sky Survey 22 August 2020

Cometary object articles
Non-periodic comets
20170521
Comets in 2022
Oort cloud
Discoveries by Pan-STARRS